Jennifer Lynette "Jenny" Turrall (later Wetton, born 9 May 1960) is an Australian former competitive swimmer who won two medals in the 400-metre and 800-metre freestyle at the 1975 World Aquatics Championships.  She competed in the same events at the 1976 Summer Olympics, with the best achievement of eighth place in the 800-metre freestyle. She is also the former world record holder. In 1993 she was inducted to the Sport Australia Hall of Fame.

Swimming career
She was not yet 14 when she won three medals, one gold and two silver, at the 1974 British Commonwealth Games in Christchurch, New Zealand, and set a world record (8:50.1) in the 800-metre freestyle on 5 January 1974 at the New South Wales state championships in Sydney.  She set another world record in the same event in 1975.  Between 1973 and 1975 she also set and then four times improved her world record in the 1500-metre freestyle.

Post-swimming career
She retired from swimming in 1976 due to injuries. After finishing school she worked at a TV station in Sydney, but then changed to healthcare and in 1982 received a nursing degree from the Concord Hospital in Sydney.

Personal life
Later she married, and changed her last name to Wetton.

See also
 List of World Aquatics Championships medalists in swimming (women)
 List of Commonwealth Games medallists in swimming (women)
 World record progression 800 metres freestyle
 World record progression 1500 metres freestyle

References

1960 births
Living people
Swimmers at the 1976 Summer Olympics
Olympic swimmers of Australia
Australian female freestyle swimmers
Sport Australia Hall of Fame inductees
World Aquatics Championships medalists in swimming
Commonwealth Games medallists in swimming
Commonwealth Games gold medallists for Australia
Commonwealth Games silver medallists for Australia
Swimmers at the 1974 British Commonwealth Games
20th-century Australian women
Medallists at the 1974 British Commonwealth Games